The All-Star Teams for the British Elite Ice Hockey League are voted for by members of Ice Hockey Journalists UK (formerly known as The British Ice Hockey Writers Association), and coaches and general managers of EIHL teams, to honour the best players at the end of each season.

2003–2004 

First Team

Second Team

2004–2005 

First Team

Second Team

2005–2006 

First Team

Second Team

2006–2007 

First Team

Second Team

2007–2008 

First Team

Second Team

2008–2009 

First Team

Second Team

2009–2010 

First Team

Second Team

2010–2011 

First Team

Second Team

2011–2012 

First Team

Second Team

2012–2013 

First Team

Second Team

2013–2014 

First Team

Second Team

2014–2015 

First Team

Second Team

2015–2016 

First Team

Second Team

2016–2017 

First Team

Second Team

2017–2018 

First Team

Second Team

2018–2019 

First Team

Second Team

2019–2020 

First Team

Second Team

2021–2022 

First Team

Second Team

External links
Elite Ice Hockey League
Ice Hockey Journalists UK
Elite Ice Hockey League First Team All Stars
Elite Ice Hockey League Second Team All Stars

All